The 2017–18 season was Leeds United's eighth consecutive season in the Championship. Along with competing in the Championship, the club also participated in the FA Cup and EFL Cup.

The season covered the period from 1 July 2017 to 30 June 2018.

Review
Hopes of improving on Leeds' play-off near-miss the previous season took an early blow when manager Garry Monk left to take over at newly-relegated Middlesbrough, leaving new owner Andrea Radrizzani to appoint Thomas Christiansen as his successor. Their promotion aspirations took another blow when Chris Wood, their top scorer in both of the previous two seasons, refused to sign a new contract and then, a few weeks into the campaign, announced that he would not play for the club again, ultimately resulting in his sale to Premier League Burnley. This, and the injury crisis hanging over from the previous season, forced Christiansen to make a large amount of new signings over the summer, leaving concerns as to whether or not the team could gel quickly enough.

Despite all this, the club had what, in the early stages at least, was an even better campaign than the previous one, with the club topping the Championship for the early months of the season. A slump in form in October was turned around in the following months, and Leeds entered the new year looking in a strong position to challenge for promotion. However, a failure to win any games in January (including a humiliating FA Cup exit to League Two side Newport County), combined with rumours of unrest in the dressing room, saw Christiansen sacked at the start of February, and replaced by Paul Heckingbottom, manager of Yorkshire rivals Barnsley. If anything, however, the loss of form that had started under Christiansen accelerated under Heckingbottom, and Leeds only won four more games all season, two of them coming in the last three matches alone, leaving Leeds with the unenviable record of having earned fewer points than any team except for bottom-placed Sunderland after Christmas. Many fans were left disillusioned by this turn of events, convinced that the previous season had been a false dawn, and that Leeds were back to the pattern of mid-table mediocrity with occasional struggles against relegation that had mostly marked the 2010s.

First team squad

Appearances (starts and substitute appearances) and goals include those in the Championship (and playoffs), League One (and playoffs), FA Cup, League Cup and Football League Trophy.

Transfers

Transfers in

Transfers out

Loans in

Loans out

Pre-season
Leeds had announced six pre-season friendlies against Harrogate Town, Guiseley, North Ferriby United, Borussia Mönchengladbach, Oxford United and Eibar.

Another friendly was scheduled against Ingolstadt, which was cancelled by local government officials in Kufstein, Austria. Instead, the club arranged a behind-closed-doors friendly in Italy with Bursaspor. The Turkish team divulged details and a video of the match to the public.

Post-season
On 24 April, Leeds United announced a post-season tour of Myanmar was to take place in May.

Competitions

Championship

League table

Result summary

Results by matchday

Matches
On 21 June 2017, the league fixtures were announced.

FA Cup
In the FA Cup, Leeds United entered the competition in the third round and were drawn away to Newport County.

EFL Cup
On 16 June 2017, Leeds United were drawn at home against Port Vale in the first round. Leeds were drawn away to Newport County for the second round, but the match was held at Elland Road due to Rodney Parade's pitch being resurfaced. The club agreed to share 45% of gate receipts for the match with Newport, despite being entitled to keep the full amount due to the change of venue. An away trip to Burnley was drawn for the third round. Another away tie against Leicester City was announced for the fourth round.

Statistics

Appearances

References

Leeds United
Leeds United F.C. seasons
Foot